The 1928-29 Arkansas Razorbacks men's basketball team represented the University of Arkansas in the 1928-29 college basketball season. They played their home games in Schmidt Gymnasium in Fayetteville, Arkansas. It was Francis Schmidt's sixth year as head coach of the Hogs and the program's sixth season overall. The Hogs won their fourth of five straight Southwest Conference championships from 1926–1930, finishing with an 11-1 conference record and a record of 19-1 overall.

The 1928–29 season saw the end of a school record thirty-one-game win streak that began the season before on December 30, 1927. The winning streak lasted 406 days before the Razorbacks fell to rival Texas on the road on February 9, 1929.

Future Arkansas coach Eugene Lambert was named to the Helms First-Team All-America squad, while Tom Pickel garnered First-Team All-America honors from College Humor.

College Football Hall of Fame member Wear Schoonover joined Lambert and Pickel on the All-SWC First-Team for 1928–29.

Future head coach of the NFL's Chicago Cardinals, Milan Creighton, played on the 1928–29 Razorback team.

Roster

Schedule and Results
Schedule retrieved from HogStats.com.

References

Arkansas Razorbacks
Arkansas Razorbacks men's basketball seasons